HMS Trafalgar was a  of the Royal Navy (RN). She was named after the Battle of Trafalgar, a decisive British victory over a Franco-Spanish Fleet in 1805. Trafalgar was built by Swan Hunter on the Tyne. She was launched on 12 January 1944 and commissioned on 23 July 1945.

Royal Navy service
In August 1945, Trafalgar commanded by Captain Anthony F Pugsley deployed to the Far East via the Mediterranean as part of the 19th Destroyer Flotilla, which consisted of her sister ships, and which performed a variety of duties in that region while based there. It was a brief stay however, for just the following year, the destroyer, along with the rest of the 19th Flotilla, returned to the UK via the Mediterranean. Upon returning home to the UK, Trafalgar was placed in reserve, an occurrence quite familiar to her sister ships during the 1950s. In 1953, while still in reserve, she took part in the Fleet Review to celebrate the Coronation of Queen Elizabeth II.

In 1958, Trafalgar emerged from a refit, was commissioned and became the leader of the 7th Destroyer Squadron, having spells with the Home and Mediterranean Fleets. Just prior to her return to the UK in 1961 she was accidentally rammed by her sister-ship , Captain(D) 1st Destroyer Squadron, thus delaying her return to the UK. In 1962, Trafalgar along with ships of the squadron, sailed for the Mediterranean for the last time, performing a number of naval exercises, as well as fly-the-flag visits.

Decommissioning and disposal
Trafalgar, with the rest of the 7th Destroyer Squadron, finally returned to the UK in 1963 where she was decommissioned, and subsequently placed in Reserve at Devonport Dockyard. She was eventually broken up for scrap at Dalmuir arriving there on 8 June 1970.

References

Publications
 
 

 

Battle-class destroyers of the Royal Navy
Ships built on the River Tyne
1944 ships
Cold War destroyers of the United Kingdom